There are several rivers named Da Prata River or Rio da Prata in Brazil:

 Da Prata River (Espírito Santo)
 Da Prata River (Goiás)
 Da Prata River (Paracatu River tributary)
 Da Prata River (Paraná)
 Da Prata River (Rio Grande do Sul)
 Da Prata River (Santa Catarina)
 Da Prata River (Tijuco River tributary) 
 Da Prata River (Tocantins)